Lublin Governorate was an administrative unit (governorate) of Congress Poland.

History

The Lublin Governorate was created in 1837 from the Lublin Voivodeship, and had the same borders and capital (Lublin) as the voivodeship.

Its lower levels of administration were also mostly unchanged, although renamed from obwóds to powiats. There were ten of those units named after their capital cities: biłgorajski, chełmski, hrubieszowski, janowski, krasnystawski, lubartowski, lubelski, puławski (from 1842: nowoaleksandryjski), tomaszowski and zamojski.

Reform of 1844 merged the governorate with Podlasie Governorate, until the 1867 reform which reversed those changes (although Podlasie Governorate was renamed to Siedlce Governorate). In 1912 some of the territories of the governorate were split off into the newly created Kholm Governorate.

Language
By the Imperial census of 1897. In bold are languages spoken by more people than the state language.

References and notes

 
Governorates of Congress Poland
States and territories established in 1837
History of Lesser Poland
Establishments in Congress Poland